Liptena orubrum, the large black liptena, is a butterfly in the family Lycaenidae. It is found in Nigeria, Cameroon, Gabon, the Republic of the Congo, the Democratic Republic of the Congo, Uganda and Tanzania. The habitat consists of forests.

Subspecies
 Liptena orubrum orubrum (southern and eastern Nigeria, Cameroon, Gabon, Congo)
 Liptena orubrum teroana Talbot, 1935 (Uganda, north-western Tanzania)
 Liptena orubrum tripunctata (Grose-Smith & Kirby, 1894) (Democratic Republic of the Congo: Mongala, Uele, North Kivu, Kasai, Sankuru and Lualaba)

References

Butterflies described in 1890
Liptena
Butterflies of Africa